5786 Talos  is an Apollo asteroid discovered on 3 September 1991 by R. H. McNaught at Siding Spring. It has a very small perihelion distance; only two other named asteroids have one less than 0.2 AU, 1566 Icarus and 3200 Phaethon.

References

External links 
 
 
 

005786
Discoveries by Robert H. McNaught
Named minor planets
Mercury-crossing asteroids
Venus-crossing asteroids
19910903